Chinnasalem is a Special Grade Town Panchayat in Kallakurichi district  in the state of Tamil Nadu, India. It is also the headquarters of Chinnasalem Taluk.

Demographics
As of 2001 India census, Chinnasalem had a population of 19519. Males constitute 50% of the population and females 50%. Chinnasalem has an average literacy rate of 75%, higher than the national average of 50.5%; with male literacy of 78% and female literacy of 50%. 11% of the population is under 6 years of age.

References

External links 

Cities and towns in Kallakurichi district